Captain Tsubasa: Rise of New Champions is an association football sports video game developed by Tamsoft and published by Bandai Namco Entertainment for Microsoft Windows, PlayStation 4 and Nintendo Switch in August 2020. It is based on the 2018 anime series Captain Tsubasa.

Gameplay
Captain Tsubasa: Rise of New Champions includes offline and online multiplayer modes, and a single-player story mode split into two sub-modes: Episode Tsubasa, allowing players to experience the original storyline, and Episode New Hero, allowing players to create their own character and level up in a fashion similar to the FIFA series' Player Career mode or Pro Evolution Soccer Become A Legend mode. In New Hero, players can choose to represent Nankatsu Middle School, Furano Middle School, Toho Academy, Musashi Middle School, Otomo Middle School or Hanawa Middle School before playing in the Junior Youth World Challenge, an international U-56 tournament.

Development 
Rise of New Champions was developed by Tamsoft, based on the 2018 anime series Captain Tsubasa, and produced by Tsuzuki Katsuaki, who described the game design as similar to arcade soccer games.

The game was announced in January 2020 with a trailer, and was released by Bandai Namco Entertainment in Japan for Nintendo Switch and PlayStation 4 on August 27, 2020, and internationally for Microsoft Windows, Nintendo Switch and PlayStation 4 on August 28, 2020.

Marketing
In April 2021, Bandai Namco Europe and the Ligue de Football Professionnel announced a partnership through which 17 of the 20 2020-21 Ligue 1 clubs (not including Paris Saint-Germain FC, Olympique Lyonnais and Olympique de Marseille) would have their kits unlockable through a two-week event in April and May 2021.

Reception

The Microsoft Windows version of the game received generally positive reviews, while the console versions were met by "mixed or average reviews", according to the review aggregator Metacritic.

The Nintendo Switch version of 'Rise of New Champions was the sixth highest selling retail game during its first week on sale in Japan, with 16,678 copies being sold. During the same week, the PlayStation 4 version sold 13,828 copies in Japan, making it the eighth bestselling retail game of the week in the country. By September 2020, over 500,000 physical and digital copies had been sold worldwide.

Notes

References

External links
Official website

2020 video games
Association football video games
Bandai Namco games
Rise of New Champions
Nintendo Switch games
PlayStation 4 games
Video games developed in Japan
Windows games
Video games with downloadable content
Multiplayer and single-player video games